Telegino is a village in Khotynetsky District of Oryol Oblast, Russia.

References

Rural localities in Oryol Oblast